Bimla Buti (born 1933) is an Indian physicist and specializes in the field of plasma physics. She was the first Indian woman Physicist Fellow of Indian National Science Academy(INSA). In 1994, she was awarded INSA-Vainu Bappu Award.

Education 
Buti obtained a BSc (Hons) and a MSc degree in Physics from University of Delhi. She was admitted to the University of Chicago for doctoral studies. She worked under the supervision of Subrahmanyan Chandrasekhar and in 1962 she earned a PhD degree in plasma physics.

Career 
After earning her doctorate, Buti returned to India and took up a teaching role at Delhi University. Two years later, she went back to the US to work at Goddard Space Flight Center.

In 1968 Buti came back to India and took a job at the Indian Institute of Technology, Delhi. Vikram Sarabhai, the then Director of Physical Research Laboratory (PRL), invited Buti to join PRL, where Buti served from 1970 to 1993 as Associate Professor, Professor, Senior Professor and Dean of Faculty.

At PRL, Buti started a new section for the experimental Plasma Physics programme. Shortly thereafter, this group was spun off as a separate institution known as Institute of Plasma Research under the aegis of the Indian Department of Atomic Energy.

Between 1985–2003, Buti was the Director of Plasma Physics at the International Centre for Theoretical Physics, Trieste, Italy.

Buti, in her career, published a large number of research papers and edited four books. Between 1977–83, she was an Associate Editor of IEEE Transactions on Plasma Science, USA. She founded Plasma Science Society and worked there as its president between 1992–1993.

Awards and honours
Buti has received the following awards during her career—
 Vikram Sarabhai Award for Planetary Sciences (1977)
 Jawarharlal Nehru Birth Centenary Lectureship Award, 1993
 INSA-Vainu Bappu Award for Astrophysics, 1994
 Professional Achievement Citation Award of University of Chicago, USA (1996)
 US Medal for Fundamental Contributions in the Physics of Nonlinear Waves and Chaos (2010)
 Fellow of TWAS
 Fellow of National Academy of Sciences (India)
 Fellow of American Physical Society
 Fellow of the Indian National Science Academy

References 

Articles created or expanded during Women's History Month (India) - 2014
Living people
1933 births
Indian women physicists
20th-century Indian physicists
Academic staff of IIT Delhi
University of Chicago alumni
Scientists from Delhi
Fellows of the Indian National Science Academy
Fellows of The National Academy of Sciences, India
Fellows of the American Physical Society
20th-century Indian women scientists